Guillermo Santo  (born 4 June 1982 in Lanús) is an Argentine association football player who most recently played defensive midfielder for F.C. Motagua.

Club career
Santo began his playing career in 1998 with Club Atlético Platense, he has also played for El Porvenir and Chacarita Juniors in Argentina. Between 2005 and 2008 he played in Venezuela for Trujillanos FC, Mineros de Guayana and Deportivo Anzoátegui.

References

External links
 Guillermo Santo at BDFA.com.ar 

1982 births
Living people
Sportspeople from Lanús
Association football midfielders
Argentine footballers
Club Atlético Platense footballers
El Porvenir footballers
Trujillanos FC players
A.C.C.D. Mineros de Guayana players
Deportivo Anzoátegui players
Chacarita Juniors footballers
F.C. Motagua players
Expatriate footballers in Venezuela
Expatriate footballers in Honduras
Liga Nacional de Fútbol Profesional de Honduras players